Saint-Louis Department is one of the 45 departments of Senegal, located in the Saint-Louis Region.

There are two communes in the department; Saint-Louis and Mpal

There is a single arrondissement, Rao, which comprises the rural districts (Communautés rurales) of:
 Fass Ngom
 Gandiole
 Gandon

In 2005, the population was estimated at 227,000.

Historic Sites

Saint-Louis town

 Island of Saint-Louis
 Faidherbe Bridge
 Ex-hydrobase and Stele at the statue of Jean Mermoz
 Fishermen's Cemetery, Langue de Barbarie
 Church and grotto of Notre-Dame de Lourdes, Sor Quarter, Saint-Louis 
 Remains of the first brickworks of Africa - Bopp-ou-Thior Island (2 km from Saint-Louis)
 Keur Cluny : Old orphanage of the Soeurs de Saint-Joseph de Cluny, Ndar Toute, Saint-Louis
 Monument to Old Soldiers - Place Pointe à Pitre, Guet-Ndar
 Marmyale Catholic cemetery, Sor Quarter, Saint-Louis
 School of the Sons of the Chief and Spokesmen, Ecole Khayar Mbengue, Sor Quarter
 Railway Station
 Ancien Temple Protestant et Asile des esclaves, Pont de Khor Saint-Louis

Arrondissement de Rao
 Tumuli of Rao (Nguiguéla, Mboy-u-Gar, Menguègne)
 Tower of Ndialakhar
 Ruins of the Fort of Laybar, near Saint-Louis
 The historic site of the Village of Nder 
 Ruins of the Post Ofiice of the bar at Mouit
 The prehistoric site of the Marigot of Khant

References

Departments of Senegal
Saint-Louis Region